Richard Fuller (April 22, 1804 – October 20, 1876) was an American Baptist minister and one of the founders of the Southern Baptist movement.

Early life

Richard Fuller was born on April 22, 1804, in Beaufort, South Carolina. He received his early instruction from Dr. William T. Brautly. At the age of seventeen, Fuller entered Harvard University in Massachusetts. Despite health problems, he graduated with his class in 1824.

He then studied law in Beaufort, was admitted to the bar and soon rose to eminence in his profession.

Career
Despite his success, during a period of great religious interest in Beaufort he felt it his duty to abandon the law and devote himself to the Christian ministry. At the same time, he decided to leave the Protestant Episcopal Church in which he had been brought up. He converted to the Baptist Church under the guidance of preacher Daniel Baker during his revival sermons at the Parish Church of St. Helena.

He was at once ordained, and called to the pastorate of the Baptist church at Beaufort. His reputation as a preacher soon became national and his services were widely sought in promoting religious revivals. In preaching, Fuller closely copied the style of French preacher James Saurin. During his residence in Beaufort, he was engaged in two memorable controversies — one with Bishop England of Charleston, on the claims of the Roman Catholic Church, and the other with President Wayland, of Brown University, on the subject of slavery. In 1836 he traveled in Europe for the benefit of his health.

In 1844, Fuller was one of the founders of the Southern Baptist movement, which split from the Northern Baptists over the issue of slavery in the United States, which Fuller and the Southern Baptists refused to oppose. He was more than once president of the Southern Baptist Convention. In 1846, he became pastor of the Seventh Baptist Church in Baltimore, Maryland, where he spent the remainder of his life. He became the pastor of Eutaw Place Baptist Church in 1871 and remained there until his death.

Writings
In addition to pamphlets and various sermons published separately, he was the author of a volume of Sermons, Letters on the Roman Chancery, Correspondence on Domestic Slavery, Argument on Baptist and Close Communion (1849), and Psalmist.

Personal life
Fuller married a wealthy widow whose affairs he attended to as an attorney.

Fuller died on October 20, 1876, at his home at 87 Park Avenue in Baltimore. He was buried at Green Mount Cemetery in Baltimore.

See also
List of Southern Baptist Convention affiliated people
Southern Baptist Convention
Southern Baptist Convention Presidents

References

Further reading
 James H. Cuthbert, Life of Richard Fuller (New York, 1879).  Cuthbert is his nephew.

External links
 
 

1804 births
1876 deaths
Harvard University alumni
Baptist ministers from the United States
Southern Baptist Convention presidents
Southern Baptists
American slave owners
19th-century American clergy